Dabis is a Turkmen village in northern Aleppo Governorate, northern Syria.

With 880 inhabitants, as per the 2004 census, Dabis administratively belongs to Nahiya Jarabulus within Jarabulus District. Nearby localities include Ayn al-Bayda  to the northeast, Balaban  to the south, and Jubb al-Kusa  to the southeast.

References

Populated places in Jarabulus District
Turkmen communities in Syria